Ireland competed at the 2004 Summer Paralympics in Athens, Greece. The team included forty-two athletes, thirty-four men and eight women. Irish competitors won four medals, three silver and one bronze to finish sixty-first in the medal table.

Medallists

Sports

Athletics

Men's track

Men's field

Women's track

Women's field

Boccia

Individual events

Pairs/teams

Cycling

Men's road

Men's track

Equestrian

Football 7-a-side
The men's team didn't win any medals: they were 7th out of 8 teams.

Players
Aidan Brennan
Andrew Clint
Kieran Devlin
Paul Dollard
Darren Kavanagh
Joseph Markey
Gary Messett
James Murrihy
Brendan O'Grady
Alan O'Hara
Peter O'Neill
Finbarr O'Riordan

Tournament

Judo

Swimming

Men

Women

See also
Ireland at the Paralympics
Ireland at the 2004 Summer Olympics

References 

Nations at the 2004 Summer Paralympics
2004
Summer Paralympics